Khoshk Rud Rural District is a rural district (dehestan) in Rudbast District, Babolsar County, Mazandaran Province, Iran. At the 2006 census, its population was 5,974, in 1,507 families. The rural district has 11 villages. Virtually all of the people living in this area are Muslim, Shia. Most of the residents are farmers and work in rice fields.

References 

Rural Districts of Mazandaran Province
Babolsar County